"Send Out the Clowns" is the 18th episode of the third season of the American sitcom Modern Family, and the series' 66th episode overall. It aired on March 14, 2012. The episode was written by Steven Levitan, Jeffrey Richman & Bill Wrubel and directed by Steven Levitan.

Plot
Cam (Eric Stonestreet) lost his clown mentor and he attends his funeral along with Mitchell (Jesse Tyler Ferguson) and other clowns. All the clowns, including Cam, are dressed up to their clown clothes and make-up to give their mentor the final farewell. At the funeral, Cam meets his former clown partner Lewis (Bobby Cannavale) who's mad at Cam because Cam left him alone after his decision to settle down and have a family with Mitchell.

Cam and Lewis decide to reconnect again and perform a show together, much to Mitchell's dismay. Just before the performance, Cam clarifies that the performance is only a "one-time thing", something that makes Lewis mad and leads their performance to a disaster.

Meanwhile, Phil (Ty Burrell) gets ready for a big real estate opportunity. He is confident and before he leaves home he tries to teach the kids that they always have to play by the rules and everything will go just fine. Unfortunately, he bumps into his nemesis, Mitzi Roth (Ellen Barkin), who steals his new potential clients by using dirty tricks.

Phil gets back home upset and when Luke (Nolan Gould) proposes that he play dirty too, he instantly forgets his "play by the rules" rule and decides to listen to him. The trick of recording Mitzi admitting she was lying does not go really well, so Luke and Phil play the "sympathy card" at an encounter with Mitzi at the grocery store and this time it pays off.

In the meantime, Claire (Julie Bowen) decides to make a Facebook page and she is upset because Alex (Ariel Winter) and Haley (Sarah Hyland) did not accept her friend request. The girls lie that they did not get any friend request from her so Claire sends one again. The reason the girls do not want their mom as a friend on Facebook is because they do not want her to know everything they do and because they do not want her to embarrass them in front of their friends. After Claire's second request, they do not have a choice than to accept her and they use other methods to make her quit Facebook.

At the Pritchett house, Manny (Rico Rodriguez) invites a friend, Griffin (Dash Dobrofsky), to come over. This surprises Jay (Ed O'Neill) because Griffin is one of the school's cool kids and it is strange that Manny hangs out with him. Jay believes that Griffin wants to hang out with Manny because of him since he dropped off Manny at school on his motorcycle, something that is cool. Gloria (Sofía Vergara) does not agree with Jay since she believes Manny is capable of having cool friends. However, she realizes that she is the reason Griffin hangs out with Manny when Griffin arrives and he can not stop staring at her.

Jay and Gloria try to tell Manny the truth of why Griffin hangs out with him and they are surprised to hear that Manny also hangs out with him to get closer to his sister and now that he knows that Griffin is also using him, he feels less guilty.

Reception

Ratings
In its original American broadcast, "Send Out the Clowns" was watched by 10.60 million; slightly down by 0.03 million from previous episode.

Reviews
"Send Out the Clowns" received positive reviews.

Laigh Raines of TV Fanatic rated the episode with 4/5. "The ending was probably my favorite part. When the girls found a picture of Claire funneling on Spring Break in 1990 and Claire started screaming "What is tagging!?!" I was in stitches laughing. This is why parents don't need Facebook!!"

Christine N. Ziemba from Paste Magazine rated the episode with 8/10 saying: "Yes, we laughed, we cried—but not nearly as much as the “Leap Day” episode." She closed her review with: "At times, the episode felt like the episode’s clown car scene—when Cam and his friends all squeeze into a Mini to head to drink after the funeral—because Levitan and company tried to cram too many things into 22 minutes. Just when things were ramping up, it was time to cue the credits."

Michael Adams of 411mania rated the episode with 8/10 naming character of the week Bobby Cannavale's character, Lewis the Clown. "Bobby made Lewis a very lewd and dirty clown, all the while being hysterical. I didn't see this coming from a guy who's known for his more serious and bad-ass roles."

Donna Bowman of The A.V. Club gave a B− rating to the episode, saying that she doesn't find clowns funny. "Clown humor. It's a tricky thing. I know it's a grand tradition of folklore and nomadic entertainment and pantomime heritage, but I don't think I'm alone in regarding clowns less as funny than as vaguely impressive in their commitment to an arcane aesthetic."

The review from The FilteredLens was also positive and rated the episode with 9/10 stating that the episode "continued to reignite the flame of this show and make season three memorable. It was definitely a classic and one of the better episodes of the season."

References

External links

"Send Out the Clowns" at ABC.com

2012 American television episodes
Modern Family (season 3) episodes
Television episodes about funerals